Neunkirch railway station is a railway station in the municipality of Neunkirch, in the Swiss canton of Schaffhausen. It is located on the standard gauge High Rhine Railway of Deutsche Bahn.

Services
 the following services stop at Neunkirch:

References

External links
 
 

Railway stations in the canton of Schaffhausen